Eupithecia concremata is a moth in the family Geometridae. It is found in central Asia.

The wingspan is about 18 mm.

References

Moths described in 1904
concremata
Moths of Asia